Coleophora testudo is a moth of the family Coleophoridae. It is found in Turkestan and Uzbekistan.

The wingspan is 10.5-11.5 mm.

The larvae feed on Astragalus (including Astragalus unifoliolatus) and Ammodendron species. They create a leafy case, which consists of a single piece of leaf. The shape of the case is more or less oval. It is cut after the first mining and immediately acquires its final size. The valve is undeveloped. The case has a length of 5–9 mm and is chocolate-brown to yellow in color. Larvae can be found at the end of May and (after diapause) from the end of March to April.

References

testudo
Moths of Asia
Moths described in 1973